Giovanni Cuniolo (25 June 1884 – 25 December 1955) was an Italian professional road racing cyclist who was born in Tortona, Italy. He won the second ever stage in Giro d'Italia history in 1909.

External links

Italian male cyclists
1884 births
1955 deaths
Cyclists from Piedmont
Italian Giro d'Italia stage winners